The Mgr. Aloysius Zichem Sportcentrum, formerly called NGVB Stadion, is an association football stadium in Paramaribo, Suriname. It is home to SVB Eerste Divisie club PVV, the football club of the Surinamese police force. S.V. Broki is also a resident of the stadium. The stadium is owned and operated by the N.G.V.B. a member association of the SVB. The Sportcentrum received its current name after the decease of Mgr. Aloysius Zichem (1933-2016), the former bishop of Paramaribo.

The Mgr. Aloysius Zichem Sportcentrum is located near the centre, in Southwestern part of Paramaribo on the Prins Hendrikstraat.

References

Football venues in Paramaribo
Athletics (track and field) venues in Suriname
Multi-purpose stadiums in Suriname
Buildings and structures in Paramaribo